The Standard Bank International Series was the name of the One Day International cricket tournament in South Africa for the 1996-97 season. It was a tri-nation series between South Africa, India and Zimbabwe.

South Africa booked a slot into the Finals through six straight wins. The slot for the second finalist came down to wire being decided in the last league match between India and Zimbabwe. India had to beat Zimbabwe to equal their points tally. They also needed to chase down the target set by Zimbabwe within 40.5 overs to ensure a slot in the Finals on the basis of Net run rate. India managed to chase the target within 40 overs thereby, moving into the Finals. South Africa beat India in the Finals to clinch the trophy.

Squads

The South Africa squad was announced on 20 January 1997. Jonty Rhodes was recalled to the side following good performances for Natal in the domestic circuit. Other inclusions included all-rounder Jacques Kallis and Pat Symcox to the side that played India in the Test series that preceded the tournament. To its squad, India named Ajay Jadeja and Robin Singh as inclusions. All-rounder Brian McMillan of South Africa was ruled out of the tournament with an inflamed tendon in his left foot and Craig Matthews was named as his replacement. Matthews injured his ankle during the second game and was replaced by Rudi Bryson.

Group stage points table
South Africa won all of their six round-robin matches. India and Zimbabwe each claimed one victory over the other. The third match between the two teams ended in a tie. Tied at 3 points each, India qualified for the final against South Africa based on superior run-rate.

Group stage matches

1st match

2nd match

3rd match

4th match

5th match

6th match

7th match

8th match

9th match

Finals

1st final

2nd final

References

External links
 Tournament home at ESPN Cricinfo

1997 in South African cricket
International cricket competitions from 1994–95 to 1997
Cricket
One Day International cricket competitions